Badarpur is a small village of Shia Jafari Mashayakhi Momin Jamat nearby the Vadnagar city in Mehsana district, in the Indian state of Gujarat. Mehsana district comprises nine talukas. These are Becharaji, Kadi, Kheralu, Mahesana, Vadnagar, Vijapur, Visnagar, Satlasana and Unjha.

History
As per the news source, Badarpur village mosque or masjid (Islamic name- AzhaKhan-e-Maher Hussain) is one of the good looking masjid of the entire Gujarat state. The great masjid took 5 years in its construction.

Demographics
All the villagers are Shia Muslims. Current population of Badarpur in 2015 is around 5000.

Education
Education in Badarpur mainly provide by the public sector as well as private sector. Badarpur is trying to progress in terms of increasing primary education attendance rate and higher education of all field.

Badarpur has English medium school named "Wisdom English School" which maintained by Maher Education & Welfare Trust. Currently the school is offering education up to 8th standard.

Economy

Agriculture
Badarpur village farmers mainly produce the Fennel, Cotton and Castor. Other major food crops produced are Wheat, Jowar, Bajra and Maize. Animal husbandry (पशुपालन) and dairying have played a vital role in the rural economy of Badarpur. Gujarat is the largest producer of milk in India.

Historical places
In Badarpur there are various historical places are located to visit, AzhaKhan-e-Mehar Hussain (masjid), Imam Hussain Dargah, Abbas Alamdar Dargah, Bagicha Dargah, Hajar Peer Bawa urf Gulam Ali Bawa Dargah and Kadme Sayyed Dargah.

Villages in Mehsana district